The Fortress of Bashtovë is a medieval quadrangular fortress located close to the outflow of the Shkumbin River into the Adriatic Sea in central Albania. It is part of the tentative list of Albania in order to qualify for inclusion in the UNESCO World Heritage Site list.

The fortress is built on a fertile flat ground east of the mouth of the Shkumbin River.

History 

Previously in the Middle Ages, the region of Bashtovë was known as a trade harbor and otherwise centre for the export of grains. The origin of the fortress has been for some time a matter of dispute among historians. The initial fortress was constructed during the time when the region was part of the Venetian Empire as according to Gjerak Karaiskaj. However, Alain Ducellier has asserted that the Venetians have built over an existing former structure, which dates back to the 6th century, when the area was under the Byzantine Empire during the Justinian dynasty.

The fortress is a rectangular structure oriented to the north-south direction. There are three entrances, from which there still are well-preserved archaeological traces they were placed at the northern, western and eastern walls.

Today 
Recently the Fortress of Bashtovë is planned to be implemented for rehabilitation by the EU4Culture.

See also 

 Castles in Albania
 World Heritage Sites in Albania
 Architecture of Albania
 Venetian Albania

References 

Castles in Albania
Tourist attractions in Albania
6th-century fortifications
Tourist attractions in Tirana County
Albanian Adriatic Sea Coast